Ruth Middleton (later Gentry; August 25, 1930 – May 13, 2008) both played and batted right-handed in the  All-American Girls Professional Baseball League between 1950 and 1953.

The Winnipeg, Manitoba, Canada-born Middleton was scouted out by the League and played first for the Chicago Colleens in 1950. A year later she moved over to play for the Battle Creek Belles where she remained until 1952.  Ruth ended her career with the League playing with the Muskegon Belles in 1953. After she ended her baseball career with the League, she went to live in Indiana, taking on a job as a bookkeeper for Yoder Ford, based in Garrett, Indiana. On October 13, 1972, she married Jerry Gentry.

In June 1998, Middleton — along with 63 other Canadian women baseball players from the All American Girls Professional Baseball League—was inducted into the Canadian Baseball Hall of Fame.

Ruth Middleton Gentry died in Indiana on  May 13, 2008, aged 77. Her death was included in the Famous Canadian Women's Historic Timeline.

Career statistics

References

1930 births
2008 deaths
All-American Girls Professional Baseball League players
Baseball people from Manitoba
Muskegon Belles players
American female baseball players
Sportspeople from Winnipeg
20th-century American women
21st-century American women